Carabus saulcyi is a species of black coloured beetle from the family Carabidae, found in Lebanon and Syria.

References

saulcyi
Beetles described in 1875